Brian T. Stewart (born October 30, 1966) is a former phlebotomist from Columbia, Illinois, who was convicted in December 1998 of injecting his son (born Bryan Stewart Jr., now known as Brryan Jackson) with HIV-contaminated blood.

Child abuse incident 
On February 6, 1992 in St Joseph's Hospital West, in Lake St. Louis, Missouri, Stewart's 11 month-old son Brian was treated for asthma and pneumonia when he was infected with the virus. Brian's mother contacted Stewart to inform him that their son was in the hospital. When he arrived, he sent Brian's mother to the café to get a beverage. Stewart then allegedly injected tainted blood into his son. When Brian's mother returned, her son was screaming in his fathers arms. The tainted blood was incompatible with Brian's. The boy was diagnosed with AIDS in 1996.

On April 22, 1998, Stewart was charged with first degree assault; the county prosecutor stated that this was because first-degree assault results in a longer sentence than attempted murder.

Prosecutors stated that Stewart was a phlebotomist who had daily access to blood, and Stewart's co-workers testified that Stewart had previously made threats to harm people using contaminated blood when he was angry. The motive behind the crime was Stewart's desire to avoid paying child support to the boy's mother. 

A Missouri jury found Stewart guilty of first-degree assault on December 6, 1998. Stewart's attorney, Joe Murphy, said that "My client has maintained all along that he is innocent" and also claimed that "Mom made an allegation and everyone ran with it."

On January 9, 1999, Stewart was sentenced to life imprisonment at St. Charles County Circuit Court. Judge Ellsworth Cundiff said that the maximum sentence was inadequate, and told Stewart "injecting a child with the HIV virus really puts you in the same category as the worst war criminal" and "when God finally calls you, you are going to burn in hell from here to eternity."

Stewart became eligible for parole in 2011, but was twice denied it and will become eligible again in 2021.

References
AIDS Policy Law. 1998 Dec 25;13(22):11

External links
Article claiming that the verdict was questionable
New York Times:  Man Accused of Injecting H.I.V. in Son
Missouri Court Ruling on denial of appeal, 2001

1966 births
Living people
Criminal transmission of HIV
People from Columbia, Illinois
American people convicted of assault
American prisoners sentenced to life imprisonment